Podvyazye is a rural locality (a village) in Andreyevskoye Rural Settlement, Alexandrovsky District, Vladimir Oblast, Russia. The population was 81 as of 2010.

Geography 
Podvyazye is located 40 km northeast of Alexandrov (the district's administrative centre) by road. Spornovo is the nearest rural locality.

References 

Rural localities in Alexandrovsky District, Vladimir Oblast